Laura Ashley Harper (born April 11, 1986) is an American basketball coach and former player who is currently the head women's basketball coach at Towson University. She played professionally with the Sacramento Monarchs of the Women's National Basketball Association.

High school
Harper played for Cheltenham High School in Wyncote, Pennsylvania, where she was named a WBCA All-American. She participated in the 2004 WBCA High School All-America Game where she scored nine points.

College
Laura Harper played college basketball at the University of Maryland and was part of the 2006 National Championship team. She tore her Achilles tendon during her freshman year, but battled back to become the Most Outstanding Player of the 2006 NCAA tournament. As she is a beloved Terrapin, Harper's No. 15 jersey hangs in the rafters at the Xfinity Center.

College statistics

Source:

Professional playing career
Harper was selected in the first round of the 2008 WNBA draft, tenth overall, by the Sacramento Monarchs. As a rookie, she played 34 games and made one start. She averaged 5.5 points and 4.0 rebounds.

After the WNBA season ended, she signed with Beşiktaş of the Turkish Women's Basketball League. She averaged 18 points and 12 rebounds in 10 games played with Beşiktaş.

In 2009, Harper returned to the Monarchs and started 11 of 33 games played. She averaged 4.5 points and 3.4 rebounds. After the WNBA season, she signed with Umana Reyer Venezia of the Italian Serie A1. In 16 games with Venezia, she averaged 9.6 points and 7.6 rebounds.

Due to injuries, Harper sat out the 2010 and 2011 WNBA seasons. She returned to action later in 2011, again in Europe, with Antakya of the Turkish league, averaging 13.3 points and 9.9 rebounds.

Harper played her final season of professional basketball in 2012–13 with Dynamo Moscow of the Russian Women's Basketball Premier League. In 12 games, she averaged 7.3 points and 8.3 rebounds.

International career
Harper was a member of the USA Women's U18 team which won the gold medal at the FIBA Americas Championship in Mayaguez, Puerto Rico. The event was held in August 2004, when the USA team defeated Puerto Rico to win the championship. Harper started all five games and helped the team win the gold medal, scoring 12.8 points per game.

Coaching career
In May 2013, Harper became an assistant coach at American University. She left American to become an assistant at Loyola University Maryland in September 2013.

Harper moved to North Carolina to become an assistant coach at High Point University in June 2014.

Following High Point, Harper served as an assistant coach for a season at George Washington University before coaching for two seasons at University of Florida.  She left Florida after the 2018–19 season to become the head coach at Montverde Academy on June 29, 2019.

Coppin State
On July 20, 2020, Harper was announced as the new head women's basketball coach at Coppin State University.

Towson University 
On April 20, 2022, Towson University announced Harper as the new head coach of their women's basketball team.

Head coaching record

Personal life
Harper's father Haviland Harper, Jr. played basketball at George Washington and is currently a high school basketball coach and math teacher. Haviland Harper's great-uncle, David "Big Dave" DeJernett, was a pioneering Afro-American basketball star at both pro and amateur levels in the Midwest.

Notes

External links
WNBA Player Profile
Maryland Terrapins bio
Coppin State bio

1986 births
Living people
American expatriate basketball people in Italy
American expatriate basketball people in Russia
American expatriate basketball people in Turkey
American women's basketball coaches
American women's basketball players
Basketball players from Philadelphia
Beşiktaş women's basketball players
Centers (basketball)
High Point Panthers women's basketball coaches
Loyola Greyhounds women's basketball coaches
Maryland Terrapins women's basketball players
McDonald's High School All-Americans
Parade High School All-Americans (girls' basketball)
People from Montgomery County, Pennsylvania
Power forwards (basketball)
Sacramento Monarchs players
San Antonio Stars players
Towson Tigers women's basketball coaches
Coppin State Eagles women's basketball coaches